Upper Wootton is a small village in the civil parish of Wootton St Lawrence with Ramsdell in the Basingstoke and Deane district of Hampshire, England.

Half a mile north-east of the village is the overgrown ring motte known as Woodgarston Castle, a possible location for the 'Castle of the Wood' recorded as having been stormed by King Stephen in 1147.

Villages in Hampshire
Basingstoke and Deane